Stanley Bridge Halt was a railway station on the Great Western Railway's branch line from Chippenham to Calne. Facilities were a wooden platform with a GWR pagoda shelter

The halt closed in 1965.

References

External links
 Stanley Bridge Halt station on navigable 1948 O. S. map
 Stanley Bridge Halt station on Subterranea Britannica

Disused railway stations in Wiltshire
Railway stations in Great Britain opened in 1905
Railway stations in Great Britain closed in 1965
1905 establishments in England
1965 disestablishments in England
Beeching closures in England
Former Great Western Railway stations